Lee Bo-Eun (born December 25, 1976) is a South Korean former swimmer, who specialized in freestyle and butterfly events. She represented South Korea in two editions of the Olympic Games (1996 and 2000), and also earned bronze medals in the medley relay at the Asian Games (1994 and 1998).

Lee made her Olympic debut at the 1996 Summer Olympics in Atlanta. She failed to reach the top 16 final in the 100 m freestyle, finishing only in thirty-fifth place at 58.27. A member of the South Korean team, she placed nineteenth in the 4×100 m freestyle relay (3:57.83), and eighteenth each in the 4×200 m freestyle relay (8:22.90) and in the 4×100 m medley relay (4:18.98).

At the 2000 Summer Olympics in Sydney, Lee drastically shortened her program on her second Olympic appearance, swimming only in two events. She achieved a FINA B-cut of 1:02.54 from the Asian Championships in Busan. On the first day of the Games, Lee placed thirty-fifth in the 100 m butterfly. Swimming in heat three, she powered past the field with an early lead at the first turn, but faded down the stretch to a fourth-place time and a lifetime best of 1:02.22. Lee also teamed up with Shim Min-Ji, Chang Hee-Jin, and Ku Hyo-Jin in the 4×100 m medley relay. Swimming the butterfly leg in heat two, Lee recorded a split of 1:03.15, but the South Koreans rounded out a six-team field to last place and seventeenth overall in a final time of 4:16.93.

References

1976 births
Living people
South Korean female butterfly swimmers
Olympic swimmers of South Korea
Swimmers at the 1996 Summer Olympics
Swimmers at the 2000 Summer Olympics
Asian Games medalists in swimming
South Korean female freestyle swimmers
Swimmers from Seoul
Asian Games bronze medalists for South Korea
Medalists at the 1994 Asian Games
Medalists at the 1998 Asian Games
Swimmers at the 1994 Asian Games
Swimmers at the 1998 Asian Games
20th-century South Korean women